Central African red colobus is the traditional name for several species of red colobus monkey that had formerly been considered a single species, Piliocolobus foai.  Central African red colobus monkeys are found in humid forests in the Democratic Republic of the Congo, the Republic of the Congo, the Central African Republic and South Sudan.

Species that have at times been included within the Central African red colobus include:

 Foa's red colobus (Piliocolobus foai)
 Lang's red colobus (Piliocolobus langi)
 Oustalet's red colobus (Piliocolobus oustaleti)
 Lomami red colobus (Piliocolobus parmentieri)
 Tana River red colobus (Piliocolobus rufomitratus)
 Semliki red colobus (Piliocolobus semlikiensis)
 Ugandan red colobus (Piliocolobus tephrosceles)

Central African red colobus monkeys are endemic to tropical central Africa, including the Republic of Congo, the southern part of the Central African Republic, the Democratic Republic of the Congo and the southern part of South Sudan. The southern limit of the range is the Congo River, the eastern limit is the Aruwimi River and the northern limit is the savannah woodlands north of the Uele River. They are found in lowland primary forest, particularly swampy areas, open woodland and gallery forest. They spend about seventy percent of their time in the canopy, and the rest of the time on the ground. They sometimes wade into water to collect aquatic bulbs.

References

Central African red colobus
Fauna of Central Africa
Mammals of the Republic of the Congo
Mammals of the Democratic Republic of the Congo
Mammals of the Central African Republic
Mammals of South Sudan
Paraphyletic groups